Corey Holmes (born November 19, 1976) is a former professional Canadian football running back and the former mayor of Metcalfe, Mississippi.

College career 
Holmes attended Mississippi Valley State University and played eight games in his senior season with the Delta Devils. He was named SWAC all-Conference and SWAC all-American Player of the Year. He had 1,167 yards on 189 carries and finished the year with 10 touchdowns. He led the team in scoring for the season with 60 points and he played on special teams. In 2014, Holmes was inducted into the Mississippi Valley State Hall of Fame.

CFL career 
Holmes was signed out of college in June 2001 by the Saskatchewan Roughriders and made one appearance in his rookie season, in week 5. He got one carry for three yards, two kickoff returns for 48 yards and four punt returns for 42 yards. He spent the remainder of the season dressed as a backup or on the practice roster.

2002 was a breakthrough year for Holmes as he led the team with seven touchdowns, 1,035 kickoff return yards and 1,023 punt return yards. He was also named a Western Division all-star, CFL Special Teams Player-of-the Year and MVP of the Roughriders as voted on by the players.

Holmes played in only 10 games in an injury plagued 2003 season. Despite the injury plagued season he was still nominated for the Most Outstanding Special Teams Player and he was healthy for the play-offs.

2004 was a healthy and productive season for Holmes. He dressed in all 18 regular season games and both play-off games. He finished the season with 635 rushing yards, 536 receiving yards and led the league with 2,704 combined yards. He was up for the Most Outstanding Teams Player for the third straight year. He was named Special Teams Player-of-the-Week in week 17.

2005 was Corey Holmes best season in his CFL career. He started the season off on a good note, scoring on the opening kick-off. Holmes Set a Rider record and was third all-time in the CFL for combined yards with 3,455, he was named the CFL's Special Teams Player of the week four times, was named the CFL's Most Outstanding Special Teams Player, was the Western nominee for Most Outstanding Player, was a CFL all-star, was nominated for the Tom Pate award as voted on by his teammates and he was the Riders Most Popular Player as voted on by the fans.

Corey Holmes followed his best ever season in the CFL with his worst in 2006. Despite being voted the team's most popular player by the fans, he was traded in April 2006 for the first overall choice in the dispersal draft (Kerry Joseph). Holmes dressed in only 10 games for the Hamilton Tiger-Cats.

2007 was his seventh season in the CFL. He was traded back to the Riders, along with Chris Getzlaf, for Wide Receiver Jason Armstead in August. He was subsequently released by the Riders on January 29, 2008, a transaction that was not well received by Roughrider fans due to his immense popularity. Saskatchewan released Corey Holmes largely because they were over the salary cap, and that Corey was a casualty of that situation. Corey stated in the Regina Leader Post that he was earning $165,000 per year and that he was due a $30,000 bonus immediately. By releasing Corey, Saskatchewan evaded paying the bonus. Corey further stated that "It's time for me to start planning for the future. We'll see if Saskatchewan hires a new coach who wants me. If not, I'll let the day go by and I'll keep talking to God. I can't let one rock get in my way. If I'm not playing anymore, it means I'll get into coaching. I really want to coach. I'll see what God wants me to do."

Transactions 
 June 2001- Signed Free Agent contract with Saskatchewan Roughriders.
 April 2006- Traded from Saskatchewan to Hamilton along with Scott Gordon for 1st overall pick in the Ottawa Renegade dispersal draft (Kerry Joseph).
 August 2007- Traded from Hamilton Tiger-Cats along with Chris Getzlaf for Jason Armstead.
 January 2008 - Released by Saskatchewan Roughriders.

Post-playing career
During the 2008 season, Holmes served as the receivers and defensive coach at Washington School in Greenville, Mississippi, helping the Washington Generals to win the 2008 Mississippi State AAA football championship. Holmes' contract was not renewed after the season.

On June 2, 2009, Holmes was elected mayor of Metcalfe, Mississippi. He defeated 14-year incumbent Shrley Allen 222 votes to 146. After eight years in office, he was unseated by Walter McDavid, Jr. in 2017.

References 

1976 births
Living people
African-American players of Canadian football
American emigrants to Canada
American football running backs
Canadian football running backs
Canadian football return specialists
Hamilton Tiger-Cats players
Mayors of places in Mississippi
Mississippi Valley State Delta Devils football players
Sportspeople from Greenville, Mississippi
Saskatchewan Roughriders players
Politicians from Greenville, Mississippi
21st-century African-American sportspeople
20th-century African-American sportspeople